East Village Radio (EVR), begun  in August 2003, was an Internet radio station which broadcast from a storefront studio in the East Village of Manhattan, in New York City.  Originally a pirate radio station broadcasting at 88.1 MHz, the station shut down on May 23, 2014 and relaunched in conjunction with Dash Radio, June 3, 2015.

EVR's street-level studio is on 21 First Avenue at East 1st Street. According to an MTA (Metropolitan Transit Authority) study of pedestrian traffic in New York City, almost 1,800 (1,000 during off-peak travel times) pedestrians passed by the sound booth per hour.

Over 60 DJs and hosts provide 16 hours of free live programming a day, in two-hour show blocks, seven days a week. Programming features a mix of music, news, comedy and commentary. Music ranges from indie to new wave to coldwave to hip hop and post punk to vintage jazz, funk and soul to house, techno and ambient electronic.

EVR supports the free radio movement.

History 

We started out as a pirate FM station, broadcasting from an apartment above Lil' Frankie's, which was essentially the office for L.F. plus a tiny adjacent room. We'd broadcast live from there, on 88.1 FM every day from 4pm-12am. We actually put the antenna on the roof of 19 1st Avenue ourselves! It was a intensely creative time, when Frank Prisinzano, myself, Jorge Docouto, and Donielle McCarry came together and formed the beginnings...— Veronica Vasicka — EVR Co-Founder, Host of Minimal Wave 

“He had some extra space in one of his restaurants and he and a friend came up with the idea for a radio station based off, I think, Free Radio Austin,... They went out and bought the equipment, climbed up on the roof of the building that houses Lil’ Frankie’s, and started broadcasting.” — Peter Ferraro, manager of East Village Radio.

EVR first aired in August 2003, broadcasting from a small room in a walk-up building at 19 First Ave. (next door to the current location) in order to provide commercial-free music and a voice for the East Village community. EVR was transmitting at twenty watts and began broadcasting online in September 2003. During transmission, EVR was broadcasting as a pirate station on 88.1FM and reached as far west as Varick Street (which also happened to be the location of one of the FCC headquarters!). About two weeks after a New York Times article on the station, EVR received a cease and desist order from the FCC.

East Village Radio was established in June 2003, initially funded by the restaurants of Frank Prisinzano, and broadcast on the airwaves at 88.1 FM.  After an article in The New York Times described the station, the FCC sent a cease-and-desist letter as the station was unlicensed to use the airwaves. Due to the difficulty of obtaining new FM licenses, the decision was made to make EVR an internet radio station.

Some time after this, it was decided to move the studio from its original location above a restaurant to a storefront booth on First Avenue in Manhattan. This was seen as a way of reconnecting EVR with the East Village community since the station was no longer literally on-the-air.

East Village Radio Festival 2008-09-06 South Street Seaport, New York, New York.

East Village Radio's DJ line-up included British multi-platinum artist and producer Mark Ronson.

Every Friday around 7:30pm, I'd leave the studio in a mad scramble to make it to EVR by 8pm. Often times, whoever I was working with in the studio would come along too, just to hang out. I remember Amy Winehouse joining me a few times, with the sweet intention of keeping me company. Then she'd eventually get bored after ten minutes and go to the tattoo parlor right next door. I think she got two or three tattoos before I decided I should stop inviting her along, for her own sake. — Mark Ronson — Host of Authentic Shit

One of its final guests before closing and relaunching was artist and Vector Gallery creator/curator JJ Brine on the AndewAndrew show.

East Village radio has now relaunched on Dash Radio and is live as of June 3, 2015.

Shows/DJs 
Accidental Rhythm /Jason Eldredge
Adequate Underground / Oblib, Jubei, Ged (w/ guests Cuba & Nano)
All Over The Shop / Ben Allen & Stuart Rogers
Analog Soul /Jacky Sommer & DatKat
Andrew Andrew Sound Sound /AndrewAndrew
Authentic Sh!t / Mark Ronson
Atlantic Tunnel / Ed Rogers & Gaz Thomas
Ballers Eve / DJ Dirrty, Minski Walker & Kat Daddy Slim
Beyond Beyond is Beyond / Mike Newman
Chances with Wolves / Mikey Palms, DJ Kool Kear & Kray
Chillin' Island / Dapwell from Das Racist / Despot (rapper)
Coalition Chart Show / Mike Joyce
Contemporary Adult / Michael Hirsch
Digital Analog Therapy / Victor Vortexx & Friends
Death By Audio / Edan Wilber
Delancey Music Service / Stretch Armstrong & Eli Escobar
Fast Forward Reverse / TimmyG
Forty Deuce / Geebee, Keene & ExPee
Fat Beats / Monster
Friction on EVR / Bobby Friction
Jamaica Rock / Queen Majesty
Gay Beach / Tedward
Genius Club / SUZ EQ
Gold River Show / Jerry Jones
Guilty Pleasure / DJ Elhaam
Happy Medium / Lane LaColla
JetLag / Andy Rourke
La Décadanse / Melody Nelson
Ladies Please / Justin C. 
Minimal Wave / Veronica Vasicka
Modern Products / Harris Smith
Morricone Youth / Devon E. Levins
Never Not Working / Oskar Mann
Pizza Party / Max & Kevin
Sandy Acres Sound Lab / Colleen Crumbcake
Seaport Music Radio / dj Pledge
Shocking Blue Sessions / Delphine Blue
Short Bus Radio / DJ Speculator
Teenage Kicks / Nick and Nick
The Big Cover Up / $mall ¢hange
The Blue Label Show / Jamal Ali
The Continuous Mammal / Niall Van Dyke
 The Let Out / The FADER
The Lillywhite Sessions / Steve Lillywhite
The Two for Tennis Show M.P. Messenie & Tim 'Love' Lee
Universópolis / Julianne Escobedo Shepherd

References

External links 
 East Village Radio, 6 September 2003, via: archive.org
 East Village Radio show archives via: archive.org

Former pirate radio stations
Pirate radio stations in the United States
Internet radio stations in the United States
Radio stations established in 2003
Radio stations disestablished in 2014